Pushyaraagam is a 1980 Indian Malayalam Comedy family entertainer directed by I.V. SASI. The film stars Madhu, Jayabharathi,Vijayasree, Jayan,Kamalhassan, Sheela, Sharada and Sridevi in the lead roles. The film has musical score by A. T. Ummer.

Cast
Madhu as Joseph-Claras husband and Saraswatis secret lover
Jayan as Rajiv-Abhiramies husband and Reshmas ex lover
Sharada as Saraswathi 
Jayabharathi as Abhiramy-Rajivs wife
Sheela as Clara-Josephs wife
Kamalhassan as Aravind-Abhiramies elder brother and Harithas husband  
Prem Nazir as Shankher-Rajivs friend (Guest appearance)
Sridevi as Reshma-Rajivs ex-girlfriend 
Seema as Reshmi- Shankhers marriage proposal (Photo only)
Meena as Narayani amma-(Guest appearance)
Vijayasree as Haritha-Aravinds Wife
Unnimary as Ranjini-Rajivs sister and Abhiramies friend (Guest appearance)
Balan K Nair as Madhava menon-Abhiramies and Aravinds father

Soundtrack
The music was composed by A. T. Ummer and the lyrics were written by Cheramangalam and Sakunthala Rajendran.

References

External links
 

1979 films
1970s Malayalam-language films
Films directed by I. V. Sasi